Wild Heart of the Young is the third album by singer/songwriter Karla Bonoff. The album includes Bonoff's only Top 40 hit, "Personally", which peaked at No. 19 on the Billboard singles chart. It is unusual in that it was not written by Bonoff.

Track listing
All songs written by Karla Bonoff, except where noted.

Reception
Rolling Stone'''s Stephen Holden notes that with this album Bonoff "has finally stopped playing the role of the passive loser…" and "strengthened her style to the point that she no longer sounds like an all-too-willing victim of love." He relates that "[i]n her finest performance, she turns Paul Kelly's "Personally,"… into a sly tour de force of sexual tease." And concludes of the album that "at its best it says goodbye to the smoggy, posh romanticism of Seventies L.A. with a confident kick of the heels."

AllMusic's William Ruhlmann retrospectively describes "Personally" as "a coy and catchy pop song utterly uncharacteristic of Bonoff's other work." He opines that "Bonoff's original songs, which made up the bulk of the album, simply were not up to the standard set by her debut, and Wild Heart Of The Young was the weakest of her three Columbia Records albums."

Charts

Weekly charts

Year End Charts

 Charting singles 

Sound track
"Wild Heart of the Young" is the sound track in the season five episode of The Wonder Years "Broken Hearts and Burgers," even though the episode itself was set in the summer of 1972, exactly ten years before the song was released.  It was also used in an episode of the mid-1980s soap opera Rituals''.

Personnel
Karla Bonoff – lead vocals, piano, acoustic guitar, electric guitar, backing vocals
Russ Kunkel – drums, percussion
Bob Glaub – bass guitar, electric guitar
Andrew Gold – electric guitar, electric piano, organ, percussion, backing vocals
Danny Kortchmar - electric guitar
Kenny Edwards – electric guitar, backing vocals
Hawk Wolinski – organ, electric piano, synthesizer
Bill Payne – synthesizer, organ
Steve Forman – percussion
Ira Ingber – electric guitar
Joe Walsh – electric guitar
Waddy Wachtel – electric guitar
David Sanborn - saxophone
Victor Feldman – vibraphone
Mark Jordan – organ
Phil Kenzie – saxophone
Don Henley, Timothy B. Schmit, J. D. Souther, Wendy Waldman, Brock Walsh – backing vocals

References

1982 albums
Karla Bonoff albums
Columbia Records albums